Gavi Dam (Malayalam:ഗവിയാർ അണക്കെട്ട്) is a small dam constructed as a part of sabarigiri Hydro electric project on Gaviyar which is a tributary of Pamba River at Seethathode village in Pathanamthitta district of Kerala, India. Taluks through which release flow are Ranni, Konni, Kozhencherry, Thiruvalla, Chengannur, Kuttanadu, Mavelikara and  Karthikappally.

Sabarigiri Hydro Electric Project (340 MW) is the second largest hydro electric project of Kerala and is located in Pathanamthitta District. This dam was constructed as a part of Sabarigiri Augmentation scheme. The reservoir is common to Gavi & Kullar dams. Water from this reservoir is diverted to Meenar–I reservoir through a tunnel.
This masonry - gravity dam has a height of 17.07 meters and is 113 meters long, and is classified under Medium height type dams. The dam construction was completed in 1990.  The dams of Moozhiyar, Kakki, Anathode, Gavi and Kochu Pamba are part of the Sabarigiri hydro-electric project.

Specifications
Latitude : 9⁰ 24′ 30 ” N
Longitude: 77⁰ 08′ 00” E
Panchayath : Seethathodu
Village : Seethathodu
District : Pathanamthitta
River Basin : Pamba
River : Gaviar
Release from Dam to river : Pamba
Year of completion : 1990
Name of Project :Sabarigiri HEP
Purpose of Project : Hydro Power
Type of Dam : Masonry – Gravity
Classification : MH ( Medium Height)
Maximum Water Level (MWL) : EL 1139.2 m
Full Reservoir Level ( FRL) : EL 1136.9 m
Storage at FRL : 2.78 Mm3
Height from deepest foundation : 17.07 m
Length : 113.00 m
Spillway : No spillway
Crest Level: NA
River Outlet : Not provided

Tourism around the Reservoir
Gavi Eco-Tourism, a project of the Kerala Forest Development Corporation is attracting lots of tourist. The project offers eco tourism activities like  jeep safari, boat ride and Sabarimala view from its view point.

References 

Dams in Kerala
Dams completed in 1990
20th-century architecture in India